Scythropiodes jiulianae is a moth in the family Lecithoceridae. It was described by Kyu-Tek Park and Chun-Sheng Wu in 1997. It is found in the Chinese provinces of Jiangxi and Sichuan.

The wingspan is 16–17 mm. The forewings are creamy white, speckled with yellowish-brown scales. The inner discal spot is found at the middle and the outer large one is found at the end. The hindwings are grey.

Etymology
The species name refers to Mt. Jiulian, the type location.

References

Moths described in 1997
Scythropiodes